Gogglebox Ireland is an Irish reality show, broadcast on Virgin Media One from 22 September 2016 onwards and a co-production between Kite Entertainment (Dublin) and Studio Lambert (London.)  The series is based on the original UK version and features 15 groups of families and friends from around Ireland who react to Irish, British and American television shows broadcast in Ireland.  As well as RTÉ, Virgin Media Television and TG4, British channels BBC One, BBC Two and Channel 4 are also available to ROI viewers so these are included in the programmes reviewed along with some broadcast on satellite channels such as Sky One, TLC and MTV.

History
The show, which follows 15 groups of families and friends from Ireland, is part of the international Gogglebox franchise. It was ordered in early 2016 and premiered on TV3 airing fourteen episodes from Thursday 22 September 2016 until 29 December 2016 in series 1 and returning on Wednesday 8 February 2017 with series 2 which ended with a highlights episode subtitled 'Best Bits' on Wednesday 3 May 2017. Series three began on Wednesday 13 September 2017 - with repeats on Saturday nights at 10.30pm - and ended on Wednesday 22 November.

The series broke new ground in the final episode of Series 1 when it featured cast's children and additional family members joining them to review the biggest TV show of the year in Ireland The Late Late Toy Show.

Following strong ratings, the series was renewed for a second series on 20 November 2016, which began broadcasting on 8 February 2017, consisting of twelve episodes and a highlights show. Series 2 saw the introduction of five new house holds from all around the country; Lauara and Aisling (Greystones), Tadgh and Ettie (County Clare), Shelly and John (Ballina), Dawn and Dale (Cork) and The Moran Family (Portlaoise)

Series 3 introduced two new households from Dublin City Centre (Couple Siobhán and Pat) and the Cooley Peninsula (Friends Michael, David and Gerry.)  Jamie welcomed baby Cobey to the Cabra household while, in Navan, Loretta gave birth to baby Asha in early November.

In the final episode of Series 3, the cast of Daddy's Home 2 - Mel Gibson, John Lithgow, Will Ferrell and Mark Wahlberg - featured as a guest 'family' on the show and reviewed 'Ireland's Fittest Family', 'Fair City' and 'Stetsons and Stilettos.'

On 23 August 2018, it was announced that Gogglebox Ireland would return for a fourth series. The series returned to Virgin Media One on 5 September 2018.

Once TV3 was bought by cable TV company Liberty Global, via their Virgin Media Ireland label, the "Googlebox Ireland" version of the series became very confusingly meta between corporate siblings, and in effect advertising for Virgin Media Ireland (the cable TV company), and Virgin Media Television (the former TV3 group of television channels, owned by the same cable TV company). Googlebox Ireland (the series format and actual series), is ultimately owned and made by All3Media, a company ultimately owned by Liberty Global & Discovery, and shown on a TV channel (TV3/Virgin Media Television Ireland) owned by Liberty Global, in turn featuring programmes shown on their own TV3/Virgin Media channels available in Ireland, with some programmes in turn also made by other parts of the All3Media/Discovery programming library, as well as featuring third party programmes from other Irish and UK channels, and online such as Netflix, also available via the Virgin Media cable TV hardware. In yet more corporate sibling cross-promotion, the show understandably features product placement of the Virgin Media Ireland cable TV equipment, such as the remote, and the series, shown on a channel owned and branded as Virgin Media Television, is sponsored by Virgin Media Ireland (the cable TV company), which also confusingly also both feature the series in their own on-demand catch-up service catalogues.

Episodes

Series 1 (2016)

Series 2 (2017)

Series 3 (2017)

Series 4 (2018)

Series 5 (2019)

Series 6 (2020)

Series 7 (2021)

Specials (2018)

Series 3 (Featured Programmes)

Series 4 (Featured Programmes)

Series 5 (Featured Programmes)

Series 6 (Featured Programmes)

Series 7 (Featured Programmes)

Cast

References

External links
 

2016 Irish television series debuts
Irish television series based on British television series
Irish reality television series
English-language television shows
Television series about television
Television series by All3Media